Cara Buono is an American actress. Emmy-nominated for her role as Dr. Faye Miller in Mad Men, she has played Karen Wheeler in the horror sci-fi  series Stranger Things since its premiere in 2016.  She also portrayed  Kelli Moltisanti in the sixth season of The Sopranos.

Early life and education
Buono was born and raised in the Bronx in a blue-collar family of Italian descent. She has two brothers and a sister.

Buono attended Fiorello H. LaGuardia High School and graduated from Columbia University where she was a double major in English and political science. She earned her degree in three years. She made her acting debut in Harvey Fierstein's play Spookhouse at the age of 12.

Career
Buono continued stage work both on Broadway and Off Broadway, and started her film career opposite Ethan Hawke and Jeremy Irons in Waterland (1992). Much of her work has been in indie films such as Chutney Popcorn (1999), Happy Accidents (2000), Next Stop Wonderland (1998) and Two Ninas (1999), which she co-produced. In 1999, she played a small role as a young Gerry Cummins in the TV movie, Deep in My Heart (1999).

She starred in the final season of the NBC drama Third Watch (1999) as paramedic Grace Foster, and Ang Lee's adaptation of Marvel Comics' Hulk in 2003 as the mother of the title character's alter ego, Bruce Banner.

She also appeared as Kelli, the wife of Christopher Moltisanti (Michael Imperioli), in the two-part final season of the HBO drama series The Sopranos, which aired in 2006 and 2007. Additionally, she appeared as Dr. Faye Miller in the fourth season of the AMC drama series Mad Men, for which she received an Emmy nomination for Outstanding Guest Actress in a Drama Series in 2011.

Personal life
Buono lives in New York City's Greenwich Village with her husband Peter Thum, founder of Ethos Water, and their daughter.

Filmography

Film

Television

Video games

References

External links
 
 

20th-century American actresses
21st-century American actresses
Actresses from New York City
American film actresses
American people of Italian descent
Year of birth missing (living people)
American stage actresses
American television actresses
Columbia College (New York) alumni
Fiorello H. LaGuardia High School alumni
Living people
People from the Bronx
1970s births